Handleyomys rostratus, also known as the long-nosed oryzomys, long-nosed rice rat, or rusty rice rat is a species of rodent in the genus Handleyomys of family Cricetidae. It is found in Belize, El Salvador, Guatemala, Honduras, Mexico, and Nicaragua. It is nocturnal and is found in forests at elevations above sea level to 1200 meters. The Handleyomys rostratus attains its highest level of development in south and Central America. High rates of deforestation and habitat destruction are the biggest threat to the Handleyomys rostratus.

References

Literature cited
Almendra, Ana Laura; González-Cózatl, Francisco X.; Engstrom, Mark D.; Rogers, Duke S. (1 November 2018). "Evolutionary relationships and climatic niche evolution in the genus Handleyomys (Sigmodontinae: Oryzomyini)". Molecular Phylogenetics and Evolution. 128: 12–25. doi:10.1016/j.ympev.2018.06.018. ISSN 1055-7903.
Duff, A. and Lawson, A. 2004. Mammals of the World: A checklist. Yale University Press, 312 pp. 
Musser, G. G. and M. D. Carleton. 2005. Superfamily Muroidea. pp. 894–1531 in Mammal Species of the World a Taxonomic and Geographic Reference. D. E. Wilson and D. M. Reeder eds. Johns Hopkins University Press, Baltimore.
Merriam, Clinton Hart (1901). Synopsis of the Rice Rats (genus Oryzomys) of the United States and Mexico. The Academy.

 

Mammals of Central America
Mammals of Mexico
Handleyomys
Mammals described in 1901
Taxonomy articles created by Polbot
Taxa named by Clinton Hart Merriam